Fairview Township is a township in Henry County, in the U.S. state of Missouri.

Fairview Township was established in 1873, taking its name from a local schoolhouse of the same name.

References

Townships in Missouri
Townships in Henry County, Missouri